Sir George Robert Laking  (15 October 1912 – 10 January 2008) was a New Zealand diplomat who served as High Commissioner to the United Kingdom, Ambassador to the United States, Secretary of Foreign Affairs and Chief Ombudsman.

Early life
Laking was born in Auckland, and educated at Auckland Grammar School, before completing his LLB at Victoria University College. He started working in the New Zealand Customs Department in 1929, before moving to the Prime Minister's Department in the fledgling Foreign Ministry. In 1940, Laking became head of the Organisation for National Security, managing the War Cabinet Secretariat, a post he held until 1948.

Early postings
In 1949, Laking was appointed Minister to the New Zealand Embassy in Washington, serving as deputy to Ambassador Carl Berendsen, for seven years. During this time, Laking was frequently the main point of contact between New Zealand and the US administration, owing to Berendsen's substantial involvement in the establishment of the United Nations as Permanent Representative to that organisation.

Laking returned to Wellington in 1956, following the death of deputy secretary Foss Shanahan, to act as Deputy Secretary of Foreign Affairs under Alister McIntosh. Laking was Acting High Commissioner to London from 1958 to 1961.

Ambassador to Washington
Laking was based in Washington as Ambassador to the United States from 1961 to 1967. This was considered to be the most important of New Zealand's foreign postings, due to the prominence of the United States, and the shift of allegiance away from the United Kingdom towards the US. During this time, the key themes were the assassination of President John Fitzgerald Kennedy, and under President Lyndon B. Johnson, the tumultuous years of escalation of US involvement in Vietnam. Laking supported New Zealand involvement in Vietnam, and was under pressure from the US Government for New Zealand to send combat troops to the conflict. McIntosh was less supportive of the idea, but Defence Chiefs in Wellington, with the notable exception of Defence Secretary Jack Hunn, and politicians unwilling to offend US interests, supported the move.

Secretary of Foreign Affairs 
In 1967, Laking returned to Wellington where he succeeded McIntosh in the posts of Secretary of Foreign Affairs and as head of the Prime Minister's Department. He held these positions his retirement in 1971. He was appointed a Companion of the Order of St Michael and St George in the 1969 New Year Honours.

Chief Ombudsman
Laking was appointed an Ombudsman in 1975, working under Sir Guy Powles. In 1977, Laking succeeded Powles as Chief Ombudsman, holding that post until 1984. He was made a Knight Commander of the Order of St Michael and St George in the 1985 Queen's Birthday Honours.

Laking chaired the government commission which recommended changes in the alcohol licensing laws. These resulted in the 1989 Sale of Liquor Act.

Notes

References
 Notable New Zealanders. The Pictorial Who's Who (1979, Paul Hamlyn Ltd, Auckland)
An eye, an ear and a voice: 50 years in New Zealand’s external relations edited by Malcolm Templeton (1993, Ministry of Foreign Affairs and Trade, Wellington NZ) 
 Undiplomatic Dialogue: Letters between Carl Berendsen and Alister McIntosh 1943–1952 edited by Ian McGibbon (1993, Auckland University Press, Auckland NZ) 
 Unofficial Channels: Letters between Alister McIntosh and Foss Shanahan, George Laking and Frank Corner 1946–1966 edited by Ian McGibbon (1999, Victoria University Press, Wellington NZ)

External links
Tribute to Sir George Laking from Prime Minister on TV One website
 Representative, A Profile of George Laking by Denis Welch

1912 births
2008 deaths
Victoria University of Wellington alumni
New Zealand Knights Commander of the Order of St Michael and St George
Ambassadors of New Zealand to the United States
New Zealand public servants
People educated at Auckland Grammar School
People from Auckland
High Commissioners of New Zealand to the United Kingdom